The 2009 NRW Trophy was held in two parts, with ice dancers competing separately from the singles disciplines and pair skating. Both competitions were held at the Eissportzentrum Westfalenhalle in Dortmund. The ice dancing competition was held between November 6 and 8, 2009, and the other disciplines were held between December 3 and 6, 2009. Skaters competed in the disciplines of men's singles, ladies' singles, pair skating, and ice dancing across the levels of senior, junior, and novice. In addition, the ice dancing competition included a pre-novice division.

Senior results

Men

Ladies

 WD = Withdrawn

Pairs

Ice dancing

 WD = Withdrawn

Junior results

Men

 WD = Withdrawn

Ladies

 WD = Withdrawn

Pairs

Ice dancing

 WD = Withdrawn

Novice results

Men

 WD = Withdrawn

Ladies

 WD = Withdrawn

Pairs

Ice dancing

 WD = Withdrawn

External links
 2009 NRW Trophy for Figure Skating results
 2009 NRW Trophy for Ice Dancing results

NRW Trophy
Nrw Trophy, 2009